Darigbed was a Sasanian title equivalent to the Byzantine title kouropalates ("palace
superintendent"). The title is first mentioned in the inscription of Shapur II (r. 240-270) at Naqsh-e Rostam.

List of prominent holders 
 Apursam-Shapur, Iranian aristocrat, who served as darigbed under Shapur I (r. 240-270).
 Bozorgmehr, aristocrat from the House of Karen, who served as darigbed under Khosrow I (r. 531-579).
 Bahram Chobin, aristocrat from the House of Mihran, who served as darigbed under Hormizd IV (r. 579–590).
 Rostam Farrokhzad, aristocrat from the House of Ispahbudhan, who served as darigbed under Khosrow II (r. 590-628).
 Farrukhzad, aristocrat from the House of Ispahbudhan, who served as darigbed under Khosrow II (r. 590-628).

References

Sources 

 
 

Sasanian palace offices
Sasanian court titles